Blekinge Regional Council is the regional council of Blekinge County, Sweden. The council was created in 1863.

The county council has 159,362 inhabitants and consists of 5 municipalities. The Blekinge council is responsible for maintaining health and dental care services as well as the public transport system.

A regional institution has been formed in a cooperation project between the primary municipalities and county councils in order to take coordinated responsibility for development in the county. In the framework of this project, Blekinge Region, for example, municipal and county councils have coordinated cultural activities and are responsible for, among others, music and the allocation of funding for the county's cultural associations.

Councillors
The council consists of 57 elected councillors, led by:
 Birgitta Ståhl  (M): Chairman of the County Council
 Peter Christensen (L): First Deputy Chairman of the County Council
 Kalle Sandström (S): Second Deputy Chairman of the County Council.

Mission
The mission of the Blekinge Regional Council is, among other things:

To outline the regional development programme of the county.
To co-ordinate regional development measures.
To decide on funds for regional projects.
To be responsible for infrastructure planning.

Politics
As of the 2018 regional election, the following political parties are represented in the Blekinge regional council.

See also
 Politics of Sweden
 Elections in Sweden

References

 

County Councils of Sweden
Organizations established in 1863
1863 establishments in Sweden